Bogdan Mazuru (born March 26, 1962, in Bucharest) is a Romanian Ambassador who is now ambassador in Austria.

Work History

 2010–present Ambassador of Romania in France
 2009 - 2010 Secretary of State for Foreign Affairs
 2006 - 2009 Ambassador of Romania in Berlin
 2001 - 2006 Permanent Representative of Romania to NATO
 09/2000 - 06/2001 Chargé d'Affaires of Romania in Washington
 1999 to 1909/2000 Director General for Foreign Affairs
 1998 - 1999 First Counselor, Permanent Delegation of Romania to NATO
 1996 - 1998 First Secretary, Embassy of Romania in Washington
 1995 - 1996 Deputy Director, European Union Foreign Affairs
 1991 - 1995 Policy Planning Division, Ministry of Foreign Affairs
 1992 Training course at the Diplomatic Academy of the German Foreign Ministry
 1986 - 1991 Automation Engineer

References

1962 births
Living people
Ambassadors of Romania to France
Ambassadors of Romania to Germany
Permanent Representatives of Romania to NATO